Pichardo is a Spanish surname. Notable people with the surname include:

Pedro Pichardo (born 1993), Cuban-Portuguese triple jumper
Miguel Angel Pichardo (born 1980), Dominican Republic basketball player
Alfonso Pichardo (born 1973), Mexican musician and singer
Eligio Pichardo (1929–1984), Dominican Republic painter
Hipólito Pichardo (born 1969), Dominican Republic baseball player
Ignacio Pichardo Pagaza (born 1935), Mexican politician
Julio Pichardo (born 1990), Cuban footballer

Spanish-language surnames